Elers is a surname, and may refer to:

 George Elers (1777–1842), British army officer
 George Elers (cricketer) (1867–1927), English cricketer
 John Philip Elers (fl. 1690–1730), English potter

See also 
Elers' Kollegium, student residence located in the medieval part of Copenhagen